The Queen Mary Falls is a plunge waterfall on Spring Creek, in the Darling Downs region of Queensland, Australia.

Location and features 
The falls are situated in the Main Range National Park and descend  from the McPherson Range near the Queensland/New South Wales border.

The falls formed when water erosion by streams created gorges through layers of basalt and resistant trachyte. The falls are currently retreating as large blocks at the bottom of the falls were not evident in photos taken in the 19th century. Facilities at the falls include toilets, tables and fireplaces.

Four other waterfalls are located in the area surrounding Killarney, including the Teviot Falls, Daggs Falls, Browns Falls and Upper Browns Falls.

See also

 List of waterfalls of Queensland

References

External links

Queen Mary Falls Circuit

Waterfalls of Queensland
Darling Downs
Plunge waterfalls
Main Range National Park